Siege of Berat may refer to:

 Siege of Berat (1280–1281), by Angevin forces against the Byzantine garrison
 Siege of Berat (1455), by the Albanian forces of the League of Lezhë, against the Ottomans.